Ravenea xerophila is a solitary medium-sized palm in the family Arecaceae. It is found only in southern Madagascar, and is threatened by habitat loss. Trees grow from 1.5–8 meters in height, and 13–30 cm in diameter.

References

External links

 Ravenea xerophila. Palmpedia.

xerophila
Endemic flora of Madagascar
Vulnerable flora of Africa
Taxonomy articles created by Polbot